Aphanoascus is a genus of fungi in the family Onygenaceae. It was circumscribed by Hugo Zukal in 1890.

Species
Aphanoascus aciculatus
Aphanoascus australis
Aphanoascus boninensis
Aphanoascus canadensis
Aphanoascus cinnabarinus
Aphanoascus clathratus
Aphanoascus cubensis
Aphanoascus durus
Aphanoascus foetidus
Aphanoascus fulvescens
Aphanoascus hispanicus
Aphanoascus keratinophilus
Aphanoascus mephitalis
Aphanoascus multiporus
Aphanoascus orissae
Aphanoascus pinarensis
Aphanoascus punsolae
Aphanoascus reticulisporus
Aphanoascus saturnoideus
Aphanoascus terreus
Aphanoascus verrucosus

References

External links

Eurotiomycetes genera
Onygenales
Taxa described in 1890
Taxa named by Hugo Zukal